Lucas Ribeiro de Oliveira (born 12 June 2000), commonly known as Lucas Macula, is a Brazilian footballer who currently plays as a midfielder for Estoril.

Career statistics

Club

Notes

References

2000 births
Living people
Brazilian footballers
Association football midfielders
Fluminense FC players